Amblyseius waltersi is a species of mite in the family Phytoseiidae.

References

waltersi
Articles created by Qbugbot
Animals described in 1981